The orange-breasted waxbill (Amandava subflava), also known as the zebra waxbill, is a small (approximately 9 cm long) sparrow-like bird with a reddish iris, orange breast, red bill and dark olive-green plumage. The male has a red rump, dark bars on the whitish flank and a scarlet eyebrow stripe. The female is duller and smaller than male; it also lacks the male's red eyebrow.

The orange-breasted waxbill is found in grassland and savannahs south of the Sahara in Africa. It has an estimated global extent of occurrence of 10,000,000 km2. This species is also introduced to other countries, e.g., Kuwait. Its diet consists mainly of seeds, insects and shoots. The female usually lays between four and six eggs in an oval-shaped nest made from grass. These nests are often the old nests of red-collared widowbirds.

Widespread and common throughout its large range, the orange-breasted waxbill is evaluated to be of least concern on the IUCN Red List of Threatened Species. It is listed on Appendix III of CITES in Ghana.

Origin
Origin and phylogeny has been obtained by Antonio Arnaiz-Villena et al. Estrildinae may have originated in India and dispersed thereafter (towards Africa and Pacific Ocean habitats).

Gallery

References

External links 
 BirdLife International species factsheet
 Species text in The Atlas of Southern African Birds

orange-breasted waxbill
Birds of Sub-Saharan Africa
Birds of the Arabian Peninsula
orange-breasted waxbill
orange-breasted waxbill